The EDZ Irigary Bridge is a historic Pennsylvania truss bridge in southeastern Johnson County, Wyoming. The bridge was built in 1913 at Sussex, Wyoming, and moved in 1963 to Irigary Road. The bridge was listed on the National Register of Historic Places in 1985 as part of a Multiple Property Submission devoted to historic bridges in Wyoming.

Design
The Pratt truss was invented in 1844 by Thomas and Caleb Pratt. A Pratt truss has vertical members and diagonals that slope down towards the center. The interior diagonals are under tension, and the vertical elements are under compression. The Pennsylvania truss is a variation on the Pratt truss. While the Pratt truss has braced diagonal members in all panels, the Pennsylvania truss has half-length struts or ties in the top, bottom, or both parts of the panels. The Pennsylvania truss is named after the Pennsylvania Railroad, which pioneered this design. The Pennsylvania truss was once used for hundreds of bridges in the United States but the design fell out of favor in the 1930s and only a few such bridges remain.

Construction
The parts for the new bridge were fabricated by the Canton Bridge Company of Canton, Ohio.

The small community of Sussex, Wyoming, grew up around the bridge, and the Sussex Post Office and Store was built the following year in 1914. The Black and Yellow Trail was established in 1915, and it crossed the Powder River using the new bridge, until the trail was rerouted through Arvada, Wyoming to the north a few years later. The road at Sussex eventually became Wyoming Highway 192.

The old steel bridge was moved by the Etlin Construction Company of Casper, Wyoming.

See also
List of bridges documented by the Historic American Engineering Record in Wyoming

References

Gallery

External links

Road bridges on the National Register of Historic Places in Wyoming
Bridges completed in 1913
Buildings and structures in Johnson County, Wyoming
Transportation in Johnson County, Wyoming
Historic American Engineering Record in Wyoming
1913 establishments in Wyoming
National Register of Historic Places in Johnson County, Wyoming
Steel bridges in the United States
Pennsylvania truss bridges in the United States